Maamobi is a town in the Greater Accra Region of Ghana. The town is known for the Accra Girls Secondary School.  The school is a second cycle institution.

References

Populated places in the Greater Accra Region